Mutant Aliens is a 2001 adult animated science-fiction-comedy film by American filmmaker Bill Plympton. The film is a spoof of B monster movies, featuring Plympton's own distinctive animation style and gratuitous sex and violence. Mutant Aliens has shown at a number of animation festivals, but has never had a wide theatrical release.

Plot
American astronaut Earl Jensen is stranded in space intentionally by the head of the Department of Space. Years later, he returns to Earth. To gain the people's trust, he tells a touching story of the time he has spent on a planet of mutant aliens. Most of the aliens in this story are oversized human body parts. It is later revealed that Jensen has really spent his time in space crossbreeding animals to create an army of mutants, in order to exact his revenge on the corrupt Department of Space head.

References

External links

2002 films
American adult animated films
American animated science fiction films
American parody films
Films about astronauts
Films directed by Bill Plympton
American animated feature films
Animated films about extraterrestrial life
2000s American animated films
Annecy Cristal for a Feature Film winners
2000s English-language films